Harold John Parlett (19 April 1925 – 6 March 2022) was a British track and field athlete who competed in the 1948 Summer Olympics. He was born in Bromley, Greater London.

Athletics career
Parlett was the 800 metres champion at the 1950 European Athletics Championships. Representing England, he won the 880-yard run at the 1950 British Empire Games and was also a silver medallist in the 4×440 yards relay. His personal best for the 800 m was 1:50.5 minutes, set in 1950.

Personal life
Parlett died on 6 March 2022, at the age of 96.

References

1925 births
2022 deaths
Athletes from London
People from the London Borough of Bromley
English male middle-distance runners
Olympic athletes of Great Britain
Athletes (track and field) at the 1948 Summer Olympics
Commonwealth Games gold medallists for England
Commonwealth Games medallists in athletics
Athletes (track and field) at the 1950 British Empire Games
European Athletics Championships medalists
Medallists at the 1950 British Empire Games